Nicol is a given name and a surname.

Given name 
 Nicol David, Malaysian squash player
 Nicol Paone, American comedian, director, water, and actores
 Nicol Williamson, Scottish actor

Surname 
 Abioseh Nicol, Sierra Leonean diplomat
 Alex Nicol, American actor
 Andy Nicol, Scottish rugby player
 Archie Nicol, Scottish footballer
 Bob Nicol, Canadian curler
 Bobby Nicol, Scottish footballer
 C. W. Nicol (1940–2020), Welsh-born Japanese writer 
 Davidson Nicol (1924-1994), Sierra Leone academic, diplomat, physician, writer and poet
 Donald Nicol (1843–1903), Scottish politician
 Eduardo Nicol, Spanish-Mexican philosopher 
 Eric Nicol, Canadian humorist
 Erskine Nicol, Scottish painter
 George Nicol (athlete), British sprinter
 Hector Nicol, Scottish Comedian
 Hugh Nicol, American baseball player
 Jacob Nicol, Canadian politician
 James Nicol (geologist), British geologist
 Jimmie Nicol, British drummer
 Johnny Nicol, Australian jazz singer
 Julia Nicol (1956-2019), South African activist
 Ken Nicol (musician), English musician
 Ken Nicol (politician), Canadian politician
 Lesley Nicol (actress), English actress
 Lesley Rumball, New Zealand netball player (born Lesley Nicol)
 Mary Leakey, British anthropologist (born Mary Douglas Nicol)
 Olive Nicol, Baroness Nicol, British politician
 Peter Nicol, British squash player
 Simon Nicol, English folk rock musician
 Steve Nicol, Scottish footballer
 Stuart Nicol, Australian footballer
 Tom Nicol, Scottish footballer
 William Nicol, British scientist and inventor of the Nicol prism

See also 
 Nikol
 Nicol prism
 Nicols
 Nicoll
 Nichol
 Nicholl
 Nicolle
 Nicola
 Nicole
 Nicolson
 MacNicol

English-language surnames
Scottish surnames
Patronymic surnames
Surnames of British Isles origin
Surnames from given names